Marco Denevi (May 12, 1922 – December 12, 1998) was an  Argentine author of novels and short stories, as well as a lawyer and journalist.  His work is characterized by its originality and depth, as well as a criticism of human incompetence.  His first work, a mystery novel titled Rosaura a las diez (1955), was a Kraft award winner and a  bestseller. In 1964, it was translated into English as Rosa at Ten O'Clock. Other famous works of his include Los expedientes (1957), Ceremonia Secreta (1960), El cuarto de la noche (1962), and Falsificaciones (1966).

Ceremonia Secreta was filmed as Secret Ceremony in 1968 starring Elizabeth Taylor, Mia Farrow, Robert Mitchum, and Peggy Ashcroft. It was directed by Joseph Losey, with a screenplay written by George Tabori. In his edition of this and other Denevi works (Macmillan, 1965), Donald A. Yates mentions Denevi's admiration for Wilkie Collins, whose work this novella resembles.

He is less known as an essayist, but he also cultivated that genre with his República de Trapalanda (1989), a late work, where he took on Ezequiel Martínez Estrada and Domingo Faustino Sarmiento's view of the Argentine republic.

He was born in the province of Buenos Aires, Argentina, and at a young age he began playing the piano and reading.  He graduated from college in 1939, and did not receive his law degree until 1956.

In 1987 he was inducted into the Argentine Academy of Letters.

It is important to note Denevi's desire to be a playwright. He wrote many dramatic pieces but felt he was not talented enough to write for the theater in Spain.

External links
Obituary on literatura.org (Spanish language)
Translation of short story in The Cafe Irreal

Secondary Sources

Gotschlich R. Guillermo. "Ceremonia secreta de Marco Denevi; enigma y ritualización". Revista Chilena de Literatura 33 (1989): 89-101.
Ramos Escobar, José L. "Ceremonia secreta: ritos". Revista Interamericana 10 (1980-1981): 19–26.
Ward, Thomas. "Marco Denevi y su propuesta en contra del Poder". En La resistencia cultural: la nación en el ensayo de las Américas. Lima: Universidad Ricardo Palma, 2004: 98-108.

Male screenwriters
1922 births
1998 deaths
People from Tres de Febrero Partido
Burials at La Recoleta Cemetery
20th-century Argentine screenwriters
20th-century Argentine male writers